Hospital de Clínicas Dr. Manuel Quintela is a hospital in the Parque Batlle neighborhood of Montevideo, Uruguay. It belongs to the Faculty of Medicine of the University of the Republic. It functions as a general hospital, and is a general reference institution. The building was designed by architect Carlos Surraco in 1928–1929. The Hospital was inaugurated on 21 September 1953. For many years it was led by Hugo Villar, who was a considerable influence on the institution. The hospital has a built-up area of 110,000 m2 on 23 floors arranged.

Areas of specialization 

 Neonatology
 Dermatology
 Endocrinology
 Geriatrics
 Hematology
 Nephrology
 Neurology
 Gastroenterology
 Oncology
 Psychology
 Psychiatry
 Physical medicine and rehabilitation
 Gynaecology
 Neurosurgery
 Cardiac surgery 
 Ophthalmology
 Otorhinolaryngology
 Urology
 Dentistry
 Plastic surgery
 Anesthesiology
 Radiology
 Nuclear medicine
 Anatomical pathology
 Hemotherapy
 Electroencephalography
 Toxicology
 Centro Nacional de Quemados (National Center for Burns)
 Instituto Nacional de Donación y Trasplante (National Institute for Donation and Transplantation)
 Laboratorio de Exploración Funcional Respiratoria (Laboratory of Functional Respiratory Exploration)

Authorities 
The Board of Directors is made up of representatives of teachers, graduates, students and non-teaching officers.

List of directors

References

External links
 https://web.archive.org/web/20120315011705/http://www.hc.edu.uy/index.php?option=com_content&task=view&id=79&Itemid=60

Hospital buildings completed in 1953
Hospitals in Montevideo
Hospitals established in 1953